The Times of Indonesia was a daily English newspaper published in Jakarta, Indonesia. Founded in 1952, it was the first English daily newspaper in Indonesia. Mochtar Lubis had close links to the army leadership. Charles Tambu, from Ceylon (present-day Sri Lanka), took over as managing editor of the newspaper.

In the aftermath of the Revolutionary Government of the Republic of Indonesia revolt, the publishing license of "The Times of Indonesia" was revoked on October 31, 1960. The publication of the newspaper was thus discontinued.

References

1952 establishments in Indonesia
1960 disestablishments in Indonesia
Defunct newspapers published in Indonesia
English-language newspapers published in Asia
Mass media in Jakarta
Newspapers established in 1952
Publications disestablished in 1960